was a Japanese physicist, best known for his development of electron holography and his experimental verification of the Aharonov–Bohm effect.

Biography
Tonomura was born in Hyōgo, Japan, and graduated from the University of Tokyo with a degree in physics. Upon graduation he joined the Hitachi Central Research Laboratory, where he later attained the title "Fellow" in 1999.

In the 1970s, Tonomura did pioneering work in the development of the electron holography microscope and observed lines of magnetic force for the first time in the world. Building on this, in 1986, he experimentally verified the Aharonov–Bohm effect, which had eluded definitive experimental proof for a long time. This experiment proved that vector potentials, which are nothing more than a mathematical concept in classical physics, are in fact physical quantities that are more fundamental than electric or magnetic fields.

Tonomura was also known for his observations of magnetic vortex movement in superconductors.

List of books available in English
 Electron Holography, 2nd edition/A. Tonomura, Springer, Springer Series in Optical Sciences (1999)

References

External links

 Hitachi Fellow: Dr. TONOMURA Akira

1942 births
2012 deaths
People from Nishinomiya
Japanese physicists
University of Tokyo alumni
Foreign associates of the National Academy of Sciences
Riken personnel
Fellows of the American Physical Society